Doukouré is a surname. Notable people with the surname include:

Cheick Doukouré (born 1992), Ivorian footballer
Cheik Doukouré (born 1943), Guinean filmmaker
Ismaël Doukouré (born 2003), French footballer 
Mohamed Doukouré (born 1953), Guinean judoka